This is a list of the 13 episodes of series two of Frontline, which first aired in 1995. In series 2, Frontline (the fictional show-within-the-show) struggles with ratings, and the network's varying attempts to heighten the ratings. The series is shot in mockumentary style. All of the show's episodes were written and directed by Rob Sitch (Mike Moore), Jane Kennedy (Brooke Vandenberg), Santo Cilauro (Geoffrey Salter) – who also did most of the camera work – and Tom Gleisner.

Cast

Main
 Rob Sitch as Mike Moore, Frontline'''s anchor
 Kevin J. Wilson as Sam Murphy, executive producer of Frontline Tiriel Mora as Martin di Stasio, reporter
 Alison Whyte as Emma Ward, the show's producer
 Jane Kennedy as Brooke Vandenberg, reporter
 Anita Cerdic as Domenica Baroni, receptionist
 Santo Cilauro as Geoffrey Salter, weatherman
 Trudy Hellier as Kate Preston, segment producer
 Pip Mushin as Stu O'Halloran, cameraman
 Torquil Neilson as Jason Cotter, sound recorder
 Linda Ross as Shelley Cohen, executive assistant to Sam

Recurring
 Genevieve Mooy as Jan Whelan, network Head of Publicity (9 episodes)
 Marcus Eyre as Hugh Tabbagh, editor (8 episodes)
 Boris Conley as Elliot Rhodes, Frontline'''s "Friday Night Funnyman" (6 episodes)
 Peter Stratford as Bob Cavell, Managing Director of the network (4 episodes)
 Eung Aun Khor as Khor, cleaner (3 episodes)

Episodes

References

External links
 Frontline website (Extremely out of date circa 1997)
 Interview with Rob Sitch on the tenth anniversary of Frontline
 Frontline DVDs at the ABC shop online

1995 Australian television seasons